European route E 81 is a road part of the International E-road network. It begins in Constanța, Romania and ends in Mukachevo, Ukraine.

The road follows the route: Mukachevo – Halmeu – Satu Mare – Zalău – Cluj-Napoca – Turda – Sebeș – Sibiu – Pitești – București – Lehliu – Fetești – Cernavodă – Constanța.

Itinerary 

: Mukachevo (Start of concurrency with ) – Berehove
: Berehove – Vylok
: Vylok – Nevetlenfolu

: Halmeu – Livada
: Livada (End of concurrency with ) – Satu Mare
: Satu Mare – Supuru de Sus
: Supuru de Sus – Zalău – Cluj-Napoca
: Cluj-Napoca (Start of concurrency with ) – Turda (End of concurrency with ) – Alba Iulia – Sebeș (Start of concurrency with ) – Sibiu (End of concurrency with )
: Sibiu
: Sibiu (Start of concurrency with ) – Veștem (End of concurrency with )
: Veștem – Râmnicu Vâlcea – Pitești
: Pitești – Bucharest
: Bucharest – Fetești – Cernavodă – Constanța
: Constanța – Agigea – Port of Constanța

References

External links 
 UN Economic Commission for Europe: Overall Map of E-road Network (2007)

81
E081
European routes in Ukraine